The 2011 Maine Black Bears football team represented the University of Maine in the 2011 NCAA Division I FCS football season. The Black Bears were led by 19th-year head coach Jack Cosgrove and played their home games at Alfond Stadium. They are a member of the Colonial Athletic Association. They finished the season 9–4, 6–2 in CAA play to finish in a three way tie for second place. They received an at-large bid into the FCS playoffs where they defeated Appalachian State in the second round before falling to Georgia Southern in the quarterfinals.

Schedule

References

Maine
Maine Black Bears football seasons
Maine
Maine Black Bears football